Ferdinand "Dindo" Pumaren, is a retired Filipino professional basketball player and former collegiate coach. In his professional playing career, he was nicknamed "The Bullet" due to his great passing and stealing.

Early career 
Pumaren suited up for San Beda in high school, teaming up with fellow future pros Magsanoc, Altamirano, Paras, Gerry Esplana and Macky de Joya in a formidable squad that won the NCAA and the national secondary crowns in the early 80s. Pumaren played collegiate ball for De La Salle Green Archers under the watch of his older brother, Derrick. While at La Salle, he studied BS-Commerce Major in Marketing Management course. He also played for Philippine basketball (RP) team for the 1986 Asian Games' basketball tournament.

Professional career 
Pumaren was drafted by Purefoods Hotdogs in 1989, and played for the team until 1994, when the won four championship.

He was traded for Pepsi for some draft picks and played for the for two seasons. He was traded back to Purefoods and won a championship in 1997. He played for the team until 2001, when he was traded to Tanduay for a future draft pick. He was absorbed by then FedEx Express, who replaced the Tanduay franchise. He retired in the end of 2002 PBA season.

Coaching career 
Pumaren was hired as head coach of UE Red Warriors, and led them to five consecutive UAAP Final Four appearances that includes a one Finals loss (because they ended up as undefeated in eliminations, so they will skip Final Four) against his alma mater, La Salle coached by his brother Franz and led by JV Casio. He was replaced by Lawrence Tiongson.

La Salle, his alma mater was hired him to replace his brother, Franz, who runs for a political position in Quezon City. He led the Archers to a final four appearance in 2010, but a dismal performance in the next year. He was replaced by future San Miguel Beermen manager Gee Abanilla.

He was rumored to return as Red Warriors' head coach, but the Red Warriors decided to hire his brother, Derrick.

Coaching record

Collegiate record

References 

Living people
Asian Games bronze medalists for the Philippines
Asian Games medalists in basketball
Basketball players at the 1986 Asian Games
Filipino men's basketball players
Medalists at the 1986 Asian Games
San Beda University alumni
De La Salle Green Archers basketball players
Magnolia Hotshots players
TNT Tropang Giga players
UE Red Warriors basketball coaches
De La Salle Green Archers basketball coaches
1965 births